Platycythara is a genus of sea snails, marine gastropod mollusks in the family Mangeliidae.

Species
Species within the genus Platycythara include:
 Platycythara curta (Dall, 1919)
 Platycythara elata (Dall, 1889)
 Platycythara electra (Dall, 1919)
 † Platycythara eurystoma  W.P. Woodring, 1928
Species brought intoi synonymy
 † Platycythara metria (Dall 1903): synonym of Vitricythara metria (Dall, 1903)

References

 Woodring, W. P. "Miocene molluscs from Bowden, Jamaica. Part 2: gastropods and discussion of results. Contributions to the geology and palaeontology of the West Indies." Carnegie Institute Washington Publication 385 (1928): 144-201.

External links
  Bouchet P., Kantor Yu.I., Sysoev A. & Puillandre N. (2011) A new operational classification of the Conoidea. Journal of Molluscan Studies 77: 273-308
 
 Worldwide Mollusc Species Data Base: Mangeliidae

 
Gastropod genera